{{Infobox football club season
| club               = Al-Batin
| season             = 2021–22
| stadium            = Al-Batin Club Stadium
| chairman           = Nasser Al-Huwaidi
| chrtitle           = President
| manager            = {{Unbulleted list|Nenad Lalatović (until 17 October)|Alen Horvat (from 21 October)}}
| league             = SPL
| league result      = 13th
| cup1               = King Cup
| cup1 result        = Quarter-finals(knocked out by Al-Fayha)
| league topscorer   = Fábio Abreu(9 goals)
| season topscorer   = Fábio Abreu(10 goals)
| highest attendance = 4,238  (vs. Al-Hazem, 27 November 2021)
| lowest attendance  = 1,102  (vs. Abha, 20 August 2021)
| average attendance = 3,015
| prevseason         = 2020–21
| nextseason         = 2022–23
| updated            = 27 June 2022
| pattern_la1 = 
| pattern_b1  = 
| pattern_ra1 = 
| pattern_sh1 = 
| pattern_so1 = 
| leftarm1    = 
| body1       = 
| rightarm1   = 
| shorts1     =
| socks1      =
| pattern_la2 = 
| pattern_b2  = 
| pattern_ra2 = 
| pattern_sh2 = 
| pattern_so2 =
| leftarm2    = 
| body2       = 
| rightarm2   = 
| shorts2     =
| socks2      =
}}
The 2021–22 season was Al-Batin's 43rd year in their existence and the fifth non-consecutive season in the Pro League. The club participated in the Pro League and the King Cup.

The season covered the period from 1 July 2021 to 30 June 2022.

Players
Squad information

Out on loan   

Transfers and loans

Transfers in

Loans in

Transfers out

Loans out

Pre-season

 Competitions 

 Overview 

GoalscorersLast Updated: 23 June 2022AssistsLast Updated: 23 June 2022Clean sheetsLast Updated: 27 June 2022''

References

Al Batin FC seasons
Batin